Cubone, known in Japan as Karakara (カラカラ), is a Pokémon species in Nintendo and Game Freak's Pokémon franchise. Designed by Ken Sugimori and first introduced in Pokémon Red and Blue, it is referred to as the "Lonely Pokémon", as it is a Pokémon that uses its mother's skull as a helmet after her death. In Pokémon Origins, Cubone is a child of a dead Marowak that died while defending it from Team Rocket. Numerous reviewers of the Pokemon franchise have commented that this background story makes Cubone one of the most memorable Pokémon, with reviewers placing its backstory on design on a spectrum ranging from touching but sad to depressing and creepy.

Concept and creation
Cubone is a Ground-type Pokémon introduced in Generation I, being designed by Ken Sugimori. According to Pokémon Yellow, Cubone wears the skull of its dead mother as a helmet, and is known as the "Lonely Pokémon" because of its tendency to keep to itself and avoid social situations, due to the trauma caused by the death of its mother. On the night of a full moon, the cries are said to be especially terrible. Cubone seems to recognize its mother in the full moon, and so it howls with a particular sadness. Its cries attract Mandibuzz, a natural predator. The stains on the skull the Pokémon wears are made by the tears it sheds. Marowak is the evolved form of Cubone, once it overcomes its sadness with its mother's death. In the games, Cubone instead evolves after reaching a certain experience level. It was also stated that Marowak was Cubone's mother being killed by the Team Rocket.

Appearances
Cubone originally appeared in Pokémon Red and Blue, then subsequently appeared in other Pokémon games such as Pokémon Yellow and Stadium, Gold, Silver, Crystal, Ruby and Sapphire, Emerald, FireRed and LeafGreen, Diamond and Pearl, Platinum, HeartGold and SoulSilver, Black and White, Black 2 and White 2, X and Y, Omega Ruby and Alpha Sapphire, Sun and Moon, Ultra Sun and Ultra Moon, Let's Go, Pikachu!, Let's Go, Eevee! and Sword and Shield. 

It also appeared in Pokémon Snap and Pokkén Tournament DX. 

Outside of Pokémon games, it appeared in Super Smash Bros. series, such as appearing in Pokémon Stadium 2 stage in Super Smash Bros. Brawl, Super Smash Bros. for Wii U and Super Smash Bros. Ultimate as a spirit.

In the anime
Cubone appears in the anime Pokémon: Indigo League. It first appeared in  "The School of Hard Knocks" under the ownership of a snobby Pokémon Academy student named Giselle, who battled her Cubone against Ash Ketchum's Pikachu. During Pikachu's Vacation. A Cubone was seen helping Team Rocket's Meowth prepare his party in Pichu Bros. in Party Panic.

In film
Cubone has appeared in the film Detective Pikachu.

Reception
Cassidee Moser of Shacknews named Cubone as one of the most disturbing Pokémon, stating that Cubone "is the stuff that brings tears to your eyes". The scene between Cubone and its dead mother Marowak in Pokémon Let's Go was one of the most memorable parts of the game according to Screen Rant writer Riley Little. Phil Hornshaw of GameSpot described a scene in the film Detective Pikachu in which Jack jokes to Tim that Cubone's loneliness makes it a good fit for him as "a lot of baggage". Comic Book Resources also claimed that Cubone joke highlights the Pokemon's most depressing facts. James Whitbrook of Gizmodo stated Cubone on Detective Pikachu as an adorable Pokémon that fans know has an incredibly heartbreaking backstory. On Pokémon Sun and Moon,  Vincent Pasquill of Comic Book Resources stated Cubone as the most enduring pokemon. David Lozada of Game Revolution included him as the scariest Pokemon of all time, and stating the skull it wears on its head is actually the remains of its dead mother. IGN ranked Cubone as 98th Pokemon in their list, and stated that the dinosaur appeal made it awesome. Ben Davis of Destructoid said that his favorite Pokemon Cubone gets its own storyline in Pokemon Red and Blue at the lavender town, and express sympathy about his mother's death. Shane Redding Terri Schwartz and Kallie Plaggie of IGN listed Cubone as the 8th Scariest Pokemon. Rafael Motamayor of Syfy ranked Cubone as one of the 10 saddest moments in Pokemon history, and stated that seeing them getting killed is devastating. Lucas Sullivan and Brett Elston of GamesRadar claimed Cubone as the most disturbing Pokemon of all time, stating that "Cubone apparently delights in collecting his parents' bones. We wonder if Cubone donned his mother's severed head before it had fully decomposed; bleached bone is all that remains after the passing years of his grotesque ornamentation". David Roberts of GamesRadar listed Cubone in the 10 unintentionally creepy characters in perfectly normal games. Jef Rouner of Houston Press listed Cubone as 10 of the creepiest Pokemon. O'Dell Harmon of Game Informer listed Cubone on the last as top 50 Pokemon of all time. Katie Seville of Game Informer also listed Cubone as ninth of the creepiest masks in video games. The Skull Crawlers on Kong: Skull Island was inspired and used the Cubone references by the look of Pokemon. Andrew Webster of The Verge claimed Cubone is a best Pokemon of all time.

Merchandise
Cubone related merchandise such as stickers, figurine, and T-shirts have been made.

References

External links

 Cubone on Bulbapedia
 Cubone on Pokemon.com

Fictional characters with earth or stone abilities
Fictional clubfighters
Orphan characters in video games
Pokémon species
Video game characters introduced in 1996
Fictional blade and dart throwers
Fictional monsters